Island House is a historical building located on Island House Lane, Yuen Chau Tsai, Tai Po, New Territories, Hong Kong.

History
Built in 1906, Island House served as the residence for the first British Police Magistrate appointed in 1898.

It was also the official residence of the North District Officer and the residences of District Commissioners for the New Territories. Island House had been resided in by a total of 15 District Commissioners since 1949. The last resident of the Island House was Sir David Akers-Jones, who became the Chief Secretary of Hong Kong in 1985.

Since then, the house has become the Island House Conservation Studies Centre after it was passed to the custodianship of WWF HK. To increase public understanding and participation in biodiversity monitoring WWF Hong Kong have been increasingly getting involved in Citizen Science, incorporating iNaturalist and the City Nature Challenge activities into their sites across Hong Kong including Island House.

Conservation
Island House is one of the declared monuments of Hong Kong since 1983.

References

External links

Virtual tour of Island House
Homepage of Island House Conservation Studies Centre
Film Service Office

Declared monuments of Hong Kong
Tai Po
Official residences in Hong Kong
Houses completed in 1905
1905 establishments in the British Empire